Jungle Hell is a 1955 American film written and directed by Norman A. Cerf. The film was made from several episodes of an unsold television pilot starring Sabu entitled Jungle Boy.  Sabu fought to not release the film. Additional footage of a flying saucer was added to the film in the 1960s with narration.

Plot
Dr. Morrison has been sent into the jungles of India to investigate reports about a strange set of burning rocks, which have left many natives with radiation burns. With Jungle Boy (Sabu) as his assistant, Morrison gives the natives medical treatment, angering the local holy man (or "witch doctor"), who perceives Morrison as a threat to his power and influence over the natives. In the course of uncovering the mystery, the Doctor, Jungle Boy and other explorers encounter what appear to be flying saucers, the sources of the radiation.

Cast
 Sabu
 K. T. Stevens as Dr. Pam Ames
 David Bruce as Dr. Paul Morrison

See also
List of American films of 1955

References

External links
 

1955 films
American fantasy films
Films set in India
1950s American films
American black-and-white films
1950s fantasy films